Eucamptognathus erinnys is a species of ground beetle in the subfamily Pterostichinae. It was described by Tschitscherine in 1893.

References

Eucamptognathus
Beetles described in 1893